Urdevassfjell  is a mountain located in Ringerike in Buskerud, Norway. The mountain is part of the Ådalsfjella range.  It is situated west of the north end of Høgfjell in Ådal and east of  Eidvatnet  in the village of  Strømsoddbygda.

References

Ringerike (traditional district)
Mountains of Viken